The Midland Railway 2228 Class was a class of 0-4-4T side tank steam locomotive designed by Samuel Johnson.  They were given the power classification 1P.

Overview
They were a follow-on to the 1823 class of 1889–1893, and were the Midland's last order of 0-4-4T locomotive, though the LMS did build some class 2 0-4-4Ts in 1932/3.

A total of fifty were built: two batches of twenty from Dübs and Company of Glasgow, were separated by an order of 10 from Derby Works.

All were in service at the 1907 renumbering, and all passed to the London, Midland and Scottish Railway at the 1923 Grouping. Withdrawals started in 1930, and twenty locomotives were still in LMS stock at the end of 1947, to be inherited by British Railways.

Withdrawal
No. 1385 was withdrawn in January 1948, and in March the remaining nineteen (1382/89/90/96/97, 1402/06/11/13/16/20–26/29/30) were allocated the BR numbers 58073–58091, although four did not receive their BR numbers before their withdrawal. The last, 58087 was withdrawn in August 1960. All members of the class were scrapped.

References 

2228
0-4-4T locomotives
Railway locomotives introduced in 1895
Standard gauge steam locomotives of Great Britain